emailSanta.com is a Christmas-themed entertainment website that claims to allow children to send emails to the legendary character Santa Claus and receive a computer-generated response from the website. It also provides various other Christmas-themed simulations.

History
emailSanta.com was started in 1997 by Alan Kerr. Kerr started the website after a strike by Canada Post workers prevented his niece and nephews from sending letters to Santa Claus, which are replied to by volunteers at Canada Post. During the first two weeks of the site's existence, emailSanta received over 1,000 emails.

In 2000, a "Santa Tracker" feature was added to the site, allowing users to simulate the tracking of Santa year-round, similar to NORAD Tracks Santa provided by North American Aerospace Defense Command (NORAD) and the Google Santa Tracker by Google. The site also features a blog and various other Christmas-themed games and apps.

The website is available in several languages.

The website was incorporated in Alberta, Canada as emailSanta.com Inc. in 2011. Individuals and entities in 26 different countries have been involved in creating emailSanta.com.

In a 2021 letter to the Search Engine Journal, Kerr noted the declining traffic of his website. He wrote that his website was historically "rewarded with #1 positions for very competitive keywords using only white hat methods" and that his website "once – briefly – beat out [the] Google [Santa Tracker] and NORAD [Tracks Santa]", but that "the site’s ranking and organic traffic has been falling hard these past two years" and that "the drop possibly happened in March 2019".

Website
Users compose their letter by filling in blank fields. Personal information, such as full name or e-mail address, is not required.

The website then simulates the process of the process of the email being sent and then compiles an immediate and personalized reply to the sender based on the user's input. The reply is automatically generated server-side using an ASP script written by Kerr, but the letter is claimed to have been written by Santa Claus himself. Optionally, the user can request to "see Santa live," in which case a video recording of an actor's portrayal of Santa would be shown to the user before the reply letter is shown, simulating a video call with Santa.

From the website's inception, children whose letters contained pleas for help were directed to a special web page on the site listing online resources for assistance and counselling helplines. In dire circumstances, police have been contacted.

Impact on popular culture
Prior to the Internet, letters to Santa were traditionally delivered by post. Tanya Gulevich, in her Encyclopedia of Christmas and New Years Celebrations wrote:

In 1997 postal workers all over the [U.S.] reported the first decline ever in the numbers of letters sent to Santa Claus at Christmas time... No one knows why so many kids all at once lost interest in writing letters to Santa. Perhaps they suddenly discovered e-mail.

Some overworked U.S. Postmasters requested children use emailSanta.com instead of sending letters via regular mail.  One particular instance was due to the anthrax scare in the early 2000s.

Beginning in 1998, users could sign up for emailSanta's "Daily Top 10" list.  Similar in spirit to Art Linkletter's work, the emailSanta list was a curated list of emails sent by visitors to the site. Some of these lists were reprinted in newspapers

 and magazines, and read on TV networks and radio stations.

Elementary school teachers have also used emailSanta.com in their classrooms to teach computer literacy and reading skills.

References

External links 

 Official website

Santa Claus
Children's websites
Internet properties established in 1997